This article is a list of professional world champions in eight-ball Pool and its variations.

American-style eight-ball pool 
This section lists world champions in the internationally standardized game ("American-style") of eight-ball, as played by professionals around the world. This is played on the 9-foot pool tables with colored, numbered balls.

WPA World Eight-ball Championship

The following is a list of WPA world eight-ball champions sanctioned by the WPA (World Pool-Billiard Association).

Chinese-style eight-ball pool

CBSA World Chinese Eight-ball Championship

The following is a list of CBSA World Chinese eight-ball champions, a Chinese variant of eight-ball pool played on a 9-foot snooker table, sanctioned by the CBSA (Chinese Billiards and Snooker Association).

British-style eight-ball pool

This section lists world champions in the world-standardized eight-ball variant blackball, and its older competing-standards "British-style" versions (usually referred to as "eightball pool") played at the amateur and semi-professional levels in Commonwealth countries and a few European nations. These tournaments are played on a 7-foot pool table with either the "spots and stripes" numbered balls, or colored balls - typically yellow and red, with a black ball.

WPA World Blackball Championship
The following is a list of WPA world blackball champions, sanctioned by the WPA (World Pool-Billiard Association). Blackball was first discussed by the WPA in a unification meeting in 2004 and then rules were presented and ratified in 2005 in anticipation of Blackball's first World Championships in 2006.

IPA World Blackball Championship
The following is a list of IPA world blackball champions, sanctioned by the IPA (International Professional Pool Association)

WEPF World Eightball Championship

The following is a list of WEPF world eightball champions, sanctioned by the WEPF (World Eightball Pool Federation). It was held for 22 consecutive years in Blackpool, England and in 2022 for the first time was held in Killarney, Ireland.

PPPO World Eightball Championship
The following is a list of PPPO world eightball champions, sanctioned by the PPPO (Professional Pool Players Organization). In 1985 the PPPO ran their first event under the "EPA world rules" that pre-dated the standardized "WEPF world rules" and drew contestants from Snooker, Pool and English Eightball, to popularize the game worldwide. From 1996 the tournament was being held annually, up until 2005, when the last tournament was held.

See also

References

External links
 WPA champions
 WEPF champions
 World Pool Champions
 European Blackball Association
 International Pool Tour

 Eight-ball
Cue sports related lists

Eight Ball